Joybubbles ( – ), born Josef Carl Engressia Jr. in Richmond, Virginia, was an early phone phreak. Born blind, he became interested in telephones at age four. He had absolute pitch, and was able to whistle 2600 hertz into a telephone, an operator tone also used by blue box phreaking devices. Joybubbles said that he had an IQ of "172 or something". According to his death certificate, he died of natural causes with congestive heart failure as a contributing condition.

Whistler
As a five-year-old, Engressia discovered he could dial phone numbers by clicking the hang-up switch rapidly ("tapping"), and at the age of 7 he accidentally discovered that whistling at certain frequencies could activate phone switches.

A student at the University of South Florida in the late 1960s, he was given the nickname "Whistler" due to his ability to place free long-distance phone calls by whistling the proper tones with his mouth. After a Canadian operator reported him for selling such calls for $1 at the university, he was suspended and fined $25 but soon reinstated. He later graduated with a degree in philosophy and moved to Tennessee.

Later life

In 1982, he moved to Minneapolis, Minnesota. He lived on his Social Security disability pension and a job as a test subject for scent-intensity research. He was an ordained minister of his own Church of Eternal Childhood, and ran a one-man nonprofit support organization for people rediscovering and re-experiencing childhood, called "We Won't Grow Up". He tried to remain an active member of the children's community around his home, giving readings at the local library and setting up phone calls to terminally ill children around the world. He often contributed to the Bulletin Board section of the St. Paul Pioneer Press newspaper.

Sexually abused as a child by one of his teachers, Joybubbles "reverted to his childhood" in May 1988 and remained there until his death, claiming that he was five years old. He legally changed his name to Joybubbles in 1991, stating that he wanted to put his past, specifically the abuse, behind him. He was listed in the local phone directory as "Joybubbles, I Am".

An avid fan of Mister Rogers, Joybubbles was mentioned in a November 1998 Esquire magazine article about children's television host Fred Rogers. In the summer of 1998, Joybubbles traveled to the University of Pittsburgh's Mister Rogers' Neighborhood Archives and listened to several hundred episodes over a span of six weeks.

An active amateur radio operator with the call sign WB0RPA, he held an amateur extra class license, the highest grade issued.  As shown in the Federal Communications Commission database, he also earned both a General radiotelephone operator license and a commercial radiotelegraph operator's license, as well as a ship radar endorsement on these certificates.  He was one of the few to qualify for the now-obsolete aircraft radiotelegraph endorsement on the latter license.

Presence in the media
 In 1971, just after his arrest, Engressia was featured in an Esquire article by Ron Rosenbaum (Secrets of the Little Blue Box) which exposed the phone phreak scene to a general public and led to further media coverage of Engressia, who became a cultural icon. 
 The 1992 movie Sneakers had a character called "Whistler", who seemed to combine traits of both Joybubbles and John Draper. The character is played by David Strathairn.
 The 2001 documentary film The Secret History of Hacking features archive footage of Joybubbles.
 In Steve Wozniak's book iWoz: From Computer Geek to Cult Icon: How I Invented the Personal Computer, Co-Founded Apple, and Had Fun Doing It, the Apple co-founder mentions Joybubbles as an early inspiration during his college years.
 On February 21, 2012, WNYC's Radiolab aired a segment on Joybubbles in an episode titled "Escape!"
 Chapter 9 of the book Exploding the Phone by Phil Lapsley details his successful plan to get a job by purposely getting arrested for phreaking.
 Phonefreaking and specifically Joybubbles were the subject of "A Call from Joybubbles", broadcast on BBC Radio 4, on March 13, 2017 and March 17, 2018.

Phone services
Joybubbles ran a weekly telephone story line called "Stories and Stuff", which was usually updated on the weekend.

In the early 1980s, he ran a phone line called the "Zzzzyzzerrific Funline", which had the distinction of being the very last entry in the phone book. During the Zzzzyzzerrific Funline days, calling himself Highrise Joe, he would go on various rants about how much he loved Valleyfair amusement park and would also regularly play and discuss Up with People.

References

External links
 New York Times Obituary
New York Times Magazine memorial profile
Pittsburgh Post-Gazette profile (2003)
Find "Exploding the Phone: The Untold Story of the Teenagers and Outlaws Who Hacked Ma Bell" in a library
11-20-91 Off the Hook interview / Summary of the Off The Hook interview
An archive of Stories and Stuff
A Haxor Radio interview with Joybubbles (April 22, 2004) 
Radiolab audio segment describing Joybubbles' background (Feb 2012)

A conversation with Joybubbles from 1998
Secrets of the Little Blue Box

1949 births
2007 deaths
Phreaking
People from Minneapolis
American blind people
University of South Florida alumni